Andrea Jaeger won in the final 6–1, 6–3 against Hana Mandlíková.

Seeds
A champion seed is indicated in bold text while text in italics indicates the round in which that seed was eliminated. The top nine seeds received a bye to the second round.

  Andrea Jaeger (champion)
  Wendy Turnbull (second round)
  Hana Mandlíková (final)
  Virginia Ruzici (quarterfinals)
 n/a
  Zina Garrison (quarterfinals)
  Kathy Rinaldi (quarterfinals)
 n/a
  Rosalyn Fairbank (second round)
  Evonne Goolagong Cawley (second round)
 n/a
  Kathy Jordan (second round)
  JoAnne Russell (third round)
  Catherine Tanvier (second round)
  Yvonne Vermaak (first round)
  Helena Suková (third round)

Draw

Finals

Top half

Section 1

Section 2

Bottom half

Section 3

Section 4

References
 1983 Avon Cup Draw (Archived 2009-07-27)

Singles